Blas de Ledesma was a Spanish painter in the early 17th century. Francisco Pacheco mentions him in Arte de la Pintura (Art of Painting). He was known to work in Granada, and in 1614, he designed a fresco for the Alhambra. His works are difficult to properly attribute, as there are many similar Spanish still life paintings with his signature, and he is sometimes confused with Blas de Prado.

References

External links

 
More info on Blas de Ledesma at the Visual Arts Data Service

17th-century Spanish painters
Spanish male painters
Spanish Baroque painters
Year of death unknown
Year of birth unknown